Brinscall railway station was a railway station that served the village of Brinscall, Lancashire, England.

History
The station was opened by the Lancashire and Yorkshire Railway. It was on the Blackburn to Chorley Line. On 4 January 1960 the station closed to passengers, although goods traffic survived until 1966. No trace of the station now exists due to redevelopment which lowered the land level and subsequent property (bungalow) construction. However, a very small section of stone wall at the one time goods yard entrance is still visible.

Services

References

Disused railway stations in Chorley
Former Lancashire Union Railway stations
Railway stations in Great Britain closed in 1960
Railway stations in Great Britain opened in 1869